A statue of Wendell Phillips (sometimes called Wendell Phillips) is installed in Boston's Public Garden, in the U.S. state of Massachusetts.

Description and history
The bronze sculpture by Daniel Chester French was cast in 1914 and dedicated on July 4, 1915. The statue rests on a Stony Creek pink granite. The artwork was surveyed by the Smithsonian Institution's "Save Outdoor Sculpture!" program in 1993.

See also

 1914 in art

References

External links
 

1914 sculptures
1915 establishments in Massachusetts
Boston Public Garden
Bronze sculptures in Massachusetts
Granite sculptures in Massachusetts
Monuments and memorials in Boston
Outdoor sculptures in Boston
Sculptures of men in Massachusetts
Statues in Boston
Sculptures by Daniel Chester French